The List of Japanese ministers, envoys and ambassadors to Germany started when Samejima Naonobu presented his credentials to the German government in 1870.

List
This is a chronological list of Japanese diplomats.

In 2013, the head of the Japanese embassy in Berlin is Takeshi Nakane.

See also
 List of German ministers, envoys and ambassadors to Japan
 Japanese people in Germany
 Germany–Japan relations
 Diplomatic rank

References

Further reading
 Nihon Kingendaishi Jiten, "Dictionary of Modern and Present Japanese History" (Tōyō Keizai Shinpōsha, 1978)
 Nihon Gaikoshi Jiten, "Dictionary of Japanese Diplomatic History" (Tokyo: Yamakawa Shuppansha, 1992)
 Website of the German embassy in Japan
 Website of the Japanese embassy in Germany

Ambassadors of Japan to Germany
Germany
Japan